Greatest Hits: Live at the House of Blues is a live album released by rapper and producer, DJ Quik. It was recorded in February 2006 during a series of sold-out shows, and released later that year. A 'Clean' edition was also released.

Track listing
"Intro for Roger"
"Mo Pussy"
"Jus Lyke Compton"
"Trouble"
"Pitch In on a Party"
"Fandango"
"Tha Bombudd"
"Sweet Black Pussy"
"Get Down"
"Down, Down, Down"
"Safe & Sound"
"Do I Love Her?"
"Quik's Groove"
"Get Up"
"'Til Jesus Comes"
"Hand In Hand"
"Medley For A V"
"We Still Party"
"Tonite"
"Born and Raised In Compton"

References

DJ Quik albums
2006 live albums
Albums produced by DJ Quik
Albums recorded at the House of Blues
Mad Science Recordings albums